Top One Project (abbreviated as T.O.P.) was a Filipino boy band based in the Philippines, originally composed of the grand winners of GMA Network's reality show To the Top — Adrian Pascual, Joshua Jacobe, Louie Pedroso, Mico Cruz, and Miko Manguba. The group signed under GMA's Artist Center and its label GMA Records after winning the competition in 2015. The group released their debut album digitally on April 28, 2016 with their carrier single, "Pag-gising".

History

2015: To the Top 

In 2015, GMA Network created To the Top, the Philippines' first  multi-platform boy band competition. The competition invited talented male singers from different school organizations nationwide to form the newest boy band sensation. Eighteen contestants went through rigorous training in singing and dancing under The CompanY's Moy Ortiz, Sweet Plantado and OJ Mariano; Sonic State Audio writers and producers Chino David, Brian Lotho, Tony V and Jon Ong; Madelle and Prince Paltu-ob, and Jesse "Reflex" Gotangco of Philippine All Stars; and the Maestro Ryan Cayabyab.

In the series' finale, Adrian Pascual, Joshua Jacobe, Louie Pedroso, Mico Cruz, and Miko Manguba were named the grand winners and formed Top One Project. Prior to joining the contest, Manguba, Pedroso and Cruz, are veteran performers in their school glee clubs. Magbanua serves as the leader of the group.

2016: Debut album and concert 

Top One Project's debut album, T.O.P., was released digitally on April 28, 2016, available on Spotify and iTunes. Under GMA Records, T.O.P. had the chance to re-record five of the most popular songs from To the Top and an original song for the album. It features six tracks: "Bakit Ganon", "Somebody", "Kaya Ko, Kaya Mo", "Alaala", their original composition, "San Na", and carrier single, "Paggising". Most of these songs are written by known musicians in the OPM industry such as Chino David from Silent Sanctuary and Brian Lotho who are both under Sonic State Audio. "San Na" was an experimental track as the group challenges their skills in writing and music production. Louie Pedroso and Mico Cruz wrote most of the lyrics while Miko Manguba, Joshua Jacobe, and Adrian Pascual focused on the overall sound and arrangement of the song. Physical copies of the album were released on May 14, 2016 and reached the third spot on the Astro Charts for the top-selling OPM albums for the month of May. Top One Project performed for almost 40,000 people on June 12, 2016 at the Philippine Arena to promote their debut album.

Top One Project had their first major concert, titled T.O.P. in Concet, on October 28, 2016 at the Music Museum.

In 2018, Miko Manguba transferred to GMA Records' rival record label, Star Music, officially announcing the end of the group.

After months on inactivity, the band held their last concert in March.

Members
 Mico Cruz
 Mico C. was born Michaelangelo Ramos Cruz on 
  Joshua Jacobe
 Joshua was born Mark Joshua Marcelo Jacobe on 
 Adrian Pascual
 Adrian was born Adrian Francisco Pascual on 
 Louie Pedroso
 Louie was born Leonard Louie Pedroso on 
 Miko Manguba
 Miko M. was born Jamiko Allan Sabbun Manguba on

Discography

Album
Top One Project (2016)

Singles
 "Paggising" 
 "Sa'n Na" 
 "Ikaw Nga"

Other works
 "Ang Pinaka Theme" 
 "Pinoy M.D. Theme" 
 "Mag-road Trip Tayo"

Filmography

Television series

Other appearances
Members of Top One Project also appeared as guests on various programs produced by GMA Entertainment TV and GMA News and Public Affairs. These programs include GMA Network's Unang Hirit, CelebriTV, Walang Tulugan with the Master Showman, Eat Bulaga!, Power House, AHA!, Sarap Diva, MARS, Sunday PinaSaya, and Wowowin and GMA News TV's Good News. Top One Project also appeared in NET25's Music and Letters in 2016. Top One Project also appeared as performers of GMA Network's new year countdown specials for 2017 

Top One Project also appeared as musical guests in GMA Network's online series Playlist and GMA Records' Spotlight Music Sessions.

Accolades

References

Filipino boy bands
Filipino pop music groups
Musical groups established in 2015
Musical groups disestablished in 2018
GMA Network personalities
GMA Music artists
2015 establishments in the Philippines